Jean-Philippe Rohr (born 23 December 1961) is a French former professional footballer who played as a midfielder.

Rohr was a member of the French squad that won the gold medal at the 1984 Summer Olympics in Los Angeles, California.

References 
 
 Profile

1961 births
Living people
French footballers
France international footballers
FC Metz players
OGC Nice players
AS Monaco FC players
Footballers at the 1984 Summer Olympics
Olympic footballers of France
Olympic gold medalists for France
Footballers from Metz
Olympic medalists in football
Ligue 1 players

Medalists at the 1984 Summer Olympics
Association football midfielders